Richard Eyre (born 1943) is an English director.

Richard Eyre may also refer to:

Richard Eyre (author), American author
Richard Eyre (footballer) (born 1976), English football player
Richard Eyre (priest) (1929–2012), Anglican priest

See also
Richard Eyres (born 1966), rugby player
Richard Ayre, former BBC journalist and administrator